Jean-Pierre Muller (23 March 1910 – 8 November 1948) was a Luxembourgian cyclist. He competed in the individual and team road race events at the 1928 Summer Olympics held in Amsterdam.

References

External links
 

1910 births
1948 deaths
Luxembourgian male cyclists
Olympic cyclists of Luxembourg
Cyclists at the 1928 Summer Olympics
People from Pétange